Cyberchase is a Canadian-American animated educational children's television series.

Cyberchase may also refer to:
 Cyberchase: Carnival Chaos, a 2003 computer game based on the TV series
 Cyberchase: Castleblanca Quest, a 2003 computer game based on the TV series
 Scooby-Doo and the Cyber Chase, a 2001 direct-to-video Scooby-Doo film
 Scooby-Doo and the Cyber Chase (video game), a 2001 video game based on the Scooby-Doo film